Brianna, Brieyana (Bree-yawn-uh), Breanna, Breanne, Briana, Brina, and Bryanna are feminine given names. Brianna is a feminine English language form of the masculine Irish language name Brian as "Briana" is the original spelling. The name is a relatively modern one and was occasionally used in England from about the 16th century and on; Briana is the name of a character in Edmund Spenser's The Faerie Queene.  In recent years, the name has become increasingly popular (especially in the United States).

Variant spellings of Brianna include: Bryanna, Breanna, and Brianne. Breanne is variant form of Breanna.

Other variant spellings of the name include Briana or Breeann. Bri and Bria are common nicknames and/or derivative names.

People with the given name
Breanna
Breanna Clark (born 1994), American Paralympic relay runner
Breanna Conrad (born 1989), American television personality
Breanna Hargrave (born 1982), Australian track cyclist
Breanna Koenen (born 1994), Australian rules footballer
Breanna Labadan (born 2006), Filipina gymnast
Breanna Leslie (born 1991), American pentathlete, heptathlete, and hurdler
Breanna Myles (born 2003), American beauty pageant titleholder
Breanna Sinclairé (born 1991), American singer
Breanna Stewart (born 1994), American basketball player
Breanna Yde (born 2003), American actress

 Briana
Briana Banks (born 1978), German-American pornographic actress and model
Briana Binch (born 1987), Australian cricketer
Briana Blasko, American photographer and artist
Briana Buckmaster (born 1982), Canadian actress and singer
Briana Corrigan (born 1965), Northern Irish singer
Briana De Souza (born 1991), Canadian soccer player
Briana Evigan (born 1986), American actress and dancer
Briana Nicole Henry (born 1992), American actress
Briana King (born 1993), American skateboarder, community organizer, model, and actress
Briana Lane (born 1985), American actress and musician
Briana Marela, American musician
Briana Mastel (born 1994), American ice hockey player
Briana Middleton, American actress, singer, and songwriter
Briana Provancha (born 1989), American sailor
Briana Scott (born 1969), American singer-songwriter
Briana Scurry (born 1971), American soccer player
Briana Sewell (born 1990), American politician
Briana Shepherd (born ), Australian journalist, reporter, and news presenter
Briana Szabó (born 2005), Romanian tennis player
Briana Venskus (born 1987), American actress
Briana Waters, American convicted arsonist
Briana Williams (born 2002), American-Jamaican sprinter
Briana Zamora (born 1973/1974), American attorney and judge

 Brianna
Brianna Beahan (born 1991), Australian hurdler
Brianna Beamish (born 1993), Canadian volleyball player
Brianna Bellido (born 1993), American-Peruvian footballer
Brianna Brown (born 1979), American actress
Brianna Buentello (born 1989), American politician
Brianna Butler (born 1994), American basketball player
Brianna Clark (born 1995), Australian rugby league footballer
Brianna Coop (born 1998), Australian Paralympic track and field athlete
Brie Bella (born 1983), ring name of Brianna Monique Danielson
Brianna Davey (born 1995), Australian rules footballer
Brianna Decker (born 1991), American ice hockey player
Brianna Denison (1988–2008), American college student and murder victim
Brianna Felnagle (born 1986), American middle-distance runner
Brianna Fortino (born 1993), American mixed martial artist
Brianna Fruean (born 1998), New Zealand activist and environmental advocate
Brianna Glenn (born 1980), American long jumper
Brianna Green (born 1996), Australian rules footballer
Brianna Hennessy (born 1984), Canadian paracanoeist
Brianna Henries (born 1991), American politician and esthetician
Brianna Hildebrand (born 1996), American actress
Brianna Holder (born 2001), Barbadian netball player
Brianna Kahane (born 2002), American violinist
Brianna Keilar (born 1980), American journalist
Brianna Keyes (born 1993), Australian handball player
Brianna Kiesel (born 1993), American basketball player
Brianna Knickerbocker, American voice actor
Brianna Lance (born 1982), American fashion designer
Brianna Lyston (born 2004), Jamaican sprinter
Brianna Miller (born 1991), Canadian rugby union player
Brianna Moyes (born 1991), Australian rules footballer
Brianna Nelson (born 1992), Canadian Paralympic swimmer
Brianna Perry (born 1992), American rapper and actress, known professionally as Lil' Brianna
Brianna Pinto (born 2000), American soccer player
Brianna Lea Pruett (1983–2015), American singer-songwriter, musician, painter, poet, and filmmaker
Brianna Rollins-McNeal (born 1991), American hurdler
Brianna Salinaro (born 1998), American Paralympic taekwondo practitioner
Brianna Ste-Marie (born 1996), Canadian grappler and Brazilian jiu-jitsu athlete
Brianna Stewart, possibly an alias of Treva Throneberry (born 1969), American imposter
Brianna Stubbs (born 1991), British rower and research scientist
Brianna Taylor (born 1987), American television personality, singer, and songwriter
Brianna Thomas, American jazz singer, vocalist, composer, songwriter, band leader, and percussionist
Brianna Throssell (born 1996), Australian swimmer
Brianna Titone, American politician and scientist
Brianna Turner (born 1996), American basketball player
Brianna Visalli (born 1995), British-American soccer player
Brianna Walle (born 1984), American racing cyclist
Brianna Westbrook (born 1984), American transgender rights activist and politician
Brianna Westrup (born 1997), American soccer player
Brianna Wu (born 1977), American video game developer and activist

 Bryanna
Bryanna McCarthy (born 1991), Canadian soccer player

See also 
Breonna, given name
Bryna (given name)

References

English feminine given names
feminine given names